The chestnut-bellied imperial pigeon (Ducula brenchleyi) is a species of bird in the family Columbidae. It is endemic to the southern Solomon Islands.

Its natural habitats are subtropical or tropical moist lowland forests and subtropical or tropical moist montane forests. It is threatened by habitat loss.

References

External links
BirdLife Species Factsheet.

chestnut-bellied imperial pigeon
Endemic birds of the Solomon Islands
chestnut-bellied imperial pigeon
chestnut-bellied imperial pigeon
Taxonomy articles created by Polbot